Galina Olegovna Stepanenko (born 12 June 1966) is a Russian ballet teacher. She is a former  prima ballerina of the Bolshoi Ballet, and since 2013 has been head of the Bolshoi's ballet troupe.

Biography
Born in Moscow on 12 June 1966, Stepanenko studied rhythmic gymnastics, studying to the first grade and receiving an invitation to the Olympic Reserve School. In 1976 she entered the Moscow Academic Choreographic School, studying under Professor Sofia Golovkina, and graduating with honours in 1984. During her studies she danced several main roles in the school's performances: as Swanhilda in Coppélia, Lise in La fille mal gardée, and the soloist in the Paquita grand pas classique.

Between 1984 and 1988 Stepanenko was a soloist of the  ensemble, studying under . In 1988 Stepanenko joined the troupe of the Stanislavski and Nemirovich-Danchenko Theatre, spending two years there under the tutelage of Nina Chkalova.

In 1992 Stepanenko graduated from the Russian Institute of Theatre Arts, having taken the course of Marina Semyonova, and received the specialty of a teacher-choreographer. In December 2012 Stepanenko retired from dancing and became a teacher-coach for the Bolshoi Ballet. On 22 January 2013 she became acting artistic director of the ballet troupe, and since autumn 2013 she has been head of the Bolshoi's ballet troupe.

Repertoire

With the Moscow Classical Ballet
Natalie (Natalie, or the Swiss Milkmaid)
Soloist (Theme and Variations)
Devil (La création du monde)
Soloist (Bachiana) 1987, choreographer Alberto Alonso

With the Stanislavski and Nemirovich-Danchenko Theatre
Odette-Odile (Swan Lake)
Kitri and the Queen of the Dryads (Don Quixote)
Kupava (The Snow Maiden)
Medora (Le Corsaire)

With the Bolshoi Ballet

1991 - Odette-Odile in Swan Lake by Pyotr Ilyich Tchaikovsky, arranged by Yury Grigorovich
1991 - Giselle in Giselle by Adolphe Adam, arranged by Yury Grigorovich
1991 - Nikiya in La Bayadère by Ludwig Minkus, arranged by Yury Grigorovich
1992 - Medora in Le Corsaire by Adolphe Adam, arranged by Konstantin Sergeyev
1992 - Bacchante in Walpurgis Night from the opera Faust by Charles Gounod, choreography by Leonid Lavrovsky
1993 - Raymonda in Raymonda by Alexander Glazunov, arranged by Yury Grigorovich
1994 - Rita in The Golden Age by Dmitri Shostakovich, choreography by Yury Grigorovich
1994 - Kitri in Don Quixote by Ludwig Minkus, arranged by Yury Grigorovich
1995 - La Sylphide in La Sylphide by Herman Løvenskiold, choreography by August Bournonville, staging by E. M. von Rosen
1995 - Aegina in Spartacus by Aram Khachaturian, choreographer Yury Grigorovich
1995 - Juliet in Romeo and Juliet by Sergei Prokofiev, choreography by Leonid Lavrovsky
1996 - The Swan Princess in Swan Lake by Pyotr Ilyich Tchaikovsky, production by Vladimir Vasiliev
1997 - Princess Aurora in The Sleeping Beauty by Pyotr Ilyich Tchaikovsky, arranged by Yury Grigorovich
1998 - Gamzatti in La Bayadère by Ludwig Minkus, arranged by Yury Grigorovich
1999 - Soloist of the 4th movement in Symphony in C to music by Georges Bizet, choreography by George Balanchine
1999 - Seventh Waltz and Prelude in Chopiniana to music by Frédéric Chopin, choreography by Michel Fokine
1999 - Popadya in Balda to music by Dmitri Shostakovich, choreographer Vladimir Vasiliev
2002 - Odette-Odile in Swan Lake by Pyotr Ilyich Tchaikovsky, arranged by Yury Grigorovich
2004 - Dancer in Tarantella to music by Louis Moreau Gottschalk, choreography by George Balanchine
2004 - Classical dancer in The Limpid Stream to music by Dmitri Shostakovich, choreographer Alexei Ratmansky
2006 - Carmen in Carmen Suite by Georges Bizet - Rodion Shchedrin, choreographer Alberto Alonso
2009 - Paquita in Paquita grand pas classique by Ludwig Minkus, arranged by

Honours and awards
1984 - Laureate of the All-Union Ballet Competition in Moscow (1st prize and Prize of the Leningrad Choreographic School, junior group)
1989 - Laureate of the International Ballet Competition in Moscow (1st prize, senior group)
1994 - Honoured Artist of Russia
1995 - Prize of the International Association of Choreographers Prix Benois de la Danse for the performance of the part of Kitri in the ballet Don Quixote
1995 - Prize "Etoile" from the magazine "Danza & Danza" (Bolzano, Italy)
1996 - People's Artist of the Russian Federation
2001 - Order of Honour
2004 - Prize of the magazine Ballet, "Soul of the Dance", in the nomination "Queen of the Dance"

Notes

References

Further reading

Bolshoi Ballet principal dancers
1966 births
Soviet ballerinas
Russian ballerinas
Ballet teachers
Moscow State Academy of Choreography alumni
20th-century Russian ballet dancers
21st-century Russian ballet dancers
Dancers from Moscow
People's Artists of Russia
Honored Artists of the Russian Federation
Recipients of the Order of Honour (Russia)
Prix Benois de la Danse winners
Living people